Pridvorci may refer to the following places:

 Pridvorci, Gornji Vakuf-Uskoplje
 Presjeka, Nevesinje
 Pridvorci, Trebinje